The following is a list of notable deaths in January 1990.

Entries for each day are listed alphabetically by surname. A typical entry lists information in the following sequence:
 Name, age, country of citizenship at birth, subsequent country of citizenship (if applicable), reason for notability, cause of death (if known), and reference.

January 1990

1
Arundhati Devi, 65, Indian actress, director, and singer.
Carmen Hill, 94, American baseball player.
Joe Hardstaff Jr, 78, English cricket player.
Patrick Kelly, 35, American fashion designer, AIDS.
Ernst Kuzorra, 84, German football player.
Niyazi Sel, 81, Turkish footballer.
T. B. Simatupang, 69, Indonesian National Armed Forces chief of staff.
James W. Wood, 65, American aeronautical engineer and astronaut.

2
Lawrence Alloway, 63, English-American art critic, cardiac arrest.
Evangelos Averoff, 79, Greek right wing politician and author, heart attack.
Bill Beckmann, 82, American baseball player.
Dally Duncan, 80, Scottish footballer.
Alan Hale, Jr., 68, American actor (Gilligan's Island, Hang 'Em High, Casey Jones), thymus cancer.
Leonhard Merzin, 55, Soviet actor.
Reginald Paget, Baron Paget of Northampton, 81, British politician.
T. R. Raghunath, 77, Indian film director.
Ben Reifel, 83, American politician, member of the U.S. House of Representatives (1961–1971), cancer.
Marianne C. Sharp, 88, American Mormon charity activist.
Vladimir Ussachevsky, 78, Soviet-American composer.

3
Loraine Boettner, 88, American theologian.
Mauro Cía, 70, Argentine boxer and actor.
Reuben Jones, 57, British equestrian rider and Olympian.
Joseph A. Loftus, 82, American journalist, stroke.
Peter van Steeden, 85, Dutch-American composer.
William Wells, 81, English politician.
Bandara Wijethunga, 50, Sri Lankan writer.

4
Robert Adams, 56, American science fiction and fantasy writer.
Lydia Bilbrook, 101, English actress.
Henry Bolte, 81, Australian politician.
Alberto Lleras Camargo, 83, Colombian politician, president (1958–1962).
Harold Eugene Edgerton, 86, American electrical engineer and academic.
Bonnie Hollingsworth, 94, American baseball player.
Florrinell F. Morton, 85, American librarian.
Boris Nikolsky, 89, Soviet chemist.
Olaf Ussing, 82, Danish actor.
Wim Volkers, 90, Dutch football player.
Alfred Michael Watson, 81, American Roman Catholic prelate.

5
Alan Handley, 77, American television producer, heart attack.
Lola Iturbe, 87, Spanish trade unionist, activist, and journalist.
Arthur Kennedy, 75, American actor (Bright Victory, Peyton Place, Lawrence of Arabia), Tony winner (1949), brain cancer.
Bartell LaRue, 57, American actor.
Kléber Piot, 69, French racing cyclist.
Robert G. Rayburn, 74, American academic and theologian, cancer.
Jaroslav Rössler, 87, Czechoslovak photographer.
Genrikh Sidorenkov, 58, Russian ice hockey player.

6
Gordon Aitchison, 80, Canadian basketball player.
Walter Anderson, 92, American baseball player.
Tadashi Asai, 54, Japanese wrestler and Olympian.
Ian Charleson, 40, Scottish actor (Chariots of Fire, Gandhi, Greystoke: The Legend of Tarzan, Lord of the Apes), AIDS.
Pavel Cherenkov, 85, Soviet physicist, Nobel Prize recipient (1958).
Peter Cookson, 76, American actor, bone cancer.
Hans Jaray, 83, Austrian actor and playwright.
Gerald Mann, 82, American football player.
Sophie Piccard, 85, Russian-Swiss mathematician.
Jake Weber, 71, American basketball player.

7
Tadeusz Brzeziński, 93, Polish-Canadian diplomat, pneumonia.
Eero Böök, 79, Finnish chess player.
Edward Ennis, 82, American civil rights lawyer, diabetes.
Gerald Gardiner, Baron Gardiner, 89, British politician.
Rose Kushner, 60, American journalist, breast cancer.
Avraham Abba Leifer, 71, Romanian-American-Israeli rabbi.
Bronko Nagurski, 81, Canadian-American football player, cardiac arrest.
Joe Robbie, 73, American politician and football executive.
Harry L. Shapiro, 87, American anthropologist.
Napua Stevens, 71, American entertainer.
Horace Stoneham, 86, American baseball executive.
Johanna Töpfer, 60, German politician, suicide.

8
Georgie Auld, 70, American musician, lung cancer.
Mario Brignoli, 87, Italian Olympic racewalker (1936).
Prince Joseph Clemens of Bavaria, 87, German royal and art historian.
Jaime Gil de Biedma, 60, Spanish poet, AIDS.
Paul A. Kennon, 55, American architect, heart attack.
Bernard Krigstein, 70, American artist.
Raymond Krug, 65, French footballer.
Johnny Sylvester, 74, American businessman.
Terry-Thomas, 78, English comedian and actor (It's a Mad, Mad, Mad, Mad World, Robin Hood, Bachelor Flat), Parkinson's disease.

9
Paul Bauer, 93, German poet.
Roger Bower, 86, British soldier.
Northern Calloway, 41, American actor (Sesame Street), beaten, cardiovascular disease.
Spud Chandler, 82, American baseball player.
Rosemarie Clausen, 82, German photographer.
Jim Gillette, 72, American football player.
Rufus Mayes, 42, American football player, bacterial meningitis.
Edward McTiernan, 97, Australian politician and judge.
Maston E. O'Neal, Jr., 82, American politician, member of the U.S. House of Representatives (1965–1971).
Bazilio Olara-Okello, 60-61, Ugandan soldier and politician, president (1985).
Shlomo Pines, 81, French-Israeli theologian.
Robert B. Pirie, 84, American naval admiral.
Cemal Süreya, 58-59, Turkish poet, diabetes.

10
John Benham, 89, British athlete.
Juliet Berto, 42, French actress, breast cancer.
Mino Guerrini, 62, Italian film director.
Tochinishiki Kiyotaka, 64, Japanese sumo wrestler, stroke.
Gene Phillips, 74, American musician.
Liesel Schuch, 98, German singer.
Otto Weidinger, 75, German nazi SS-obersturmbannführer during World War II.
Lyle R. Wheeler, 84, American art director (Gone with the Wind, The Diary of Anne Frank, Rebecca), five-time Oscar winner, pneumonia.
Herbert Williams, 81, American sailor and Olympic champion.

11
Carolyn Haywood, 92, American children's writer and illustrator.
Earl D. Johnson, 84,  United States Under Secretary of the Army.
Ihsan Abdel Quddous, 71, Egyptian journalist, novelist and short-story writer, stroke.
Kittens Reichert, 79, American actress.
José Luis García Traid, 53, Spanish footballer, complications during surgery.

12
Joseph Sill Clark Jr., 88, American politician, member of the U.S. Senate (1957–1969).
John Hansen, 65, Danish footballer.
Ralph Heikkinen, 72, American football player.
Laurence J. Peter, 70, Canadian-American educator, stroke.
Paul Pisk, 96, Austrian-American composer.

13
Gaston Crunelle, 91, French flautist.
Francisco Hormazábal, 69, Chilean football player and manager.
Roy Jarvis, 63, American baseball player.
Jenő Kalmár, 81, Hungarian footballer.
Avraham Ofek, 54, Bulgarian-Israeli artist.
Pierre Pascal, 80, French poet and translator.
Gerhard Sturmberger, 49, Austrian football player.

14
Ruth Bunzel, 91, American anthropologist.
Sten-Åke Cederhök, 76, Swedish actor.
Sabri Dino, 48, Turkish footballer, suicide.
India Edwards, 94, American journalist.
Ken Kilrea, 70, Canadian ice hockey player.
Rosalind Pitt-Rivers, 82, British biochemist.
Anno Smith, 74, Dutch artist.
James Arthur Williams, 59, American antiques dealer, heart failure.
John Witty, 74, British film and television actor.

15
Bill Albans, 64, American Olympic athlete (1948, 1952).
Mani Madhava Chakyar, 90, Indian performance artist and sanskrit scholar.
Brainard Cheney, 89, American writer.
R. R. Diwakar, 95, Indian politician and writer.
František Douda, 81, Czechoslovak Olympic shot putter (1932).
Gordon Jackson, 66, Scottish actor (Upstairs, Downstairs, The Great Escape, The Ipcress File), bone cancer.
Donold Lourie, 90, American businessman and football player.
Fred Mundee, 76, American football player.
William O'Neal, 40, American FBI Black Panther Party informant, suicide by traffic collision.
Peggy van Praagh, 79, British-Australian ballet dancer and choreographer.

16
Lady Eve Balfour, 91, British farmer and organic farming pioneer.
Bill Heaton, 71, English footballer.
Clarence Janecek, 78, American gridiron football player.
Robert Lamartine, 54, French footballer.
Earl Naylor, 70, American baseball player.
Jean Saint-Fort Paillard, 76, French equestrian and Olympic champion.
Ruskin Spear, 78, English painter.

17
Andreas Aulie, 92, Norwegian jurist.
Fritz Brocksieper, 77, German musician.
Danie Burger, 56, South African Olympic hurdler (1956).
Anna Arnold Hedgeman, 90, American civil rights activist.
Charles Hernu, 66, French politician.
André Morice, 89, French politician.
Léon Motchane, 89, French mathematician.
Simon Nicholson, 55, British artist.
Y. C. James Yen, 96, Chinese educator and organizer, pneumonia.

18
Melanie Appleby, 23, English singer, pneumonia.
Kim Chang-Hee, 68, South Korean weightlifter and Olympic medalist.
Rusty Hamer, 42, American actor, suicide by gunshot.
Edouard Izac, 98, American politician, member of the U.S. House of Representatives (1937–1947),  heart failure.
Candy Jones, 64, American model and broadcaster, cancer.
Ivan Mackenzie Lamb, 78, British explorer and botanist, ALS.

19
Carlo Bagno, 69, Italian actor.
Pierre Barbizet, 67, French pianist.
Viña Delmar, 86, American novelist, playwright, and screenwriter.
Arthur Goldberg, 81, American judge and diplomat, heart failure.
Movses Gorgisyan, 28, Soviet Armenian independence activist and soldier, killed in battle.
Aldo Gucci, 84, Italian businessman (Gucci), prostate cancer.
Myles Horton, 84, American educator, brain tumor.
Alexander Pechersky, 80, Soviet soldier and humanitarian.
Rajneesh, 58, Indian mystic, heart failure.
Alberto Semprini, 81, English pianist, Alzheimer's disease.
Maharram Seyidov, 37, Soviet Azerbaijani soldier, killed in battle.
Herbert Wehner, 83, German politician, diabetes.
J. Ernest Wharton, 90, American politician, member of the U.S. House of Representatives (1951–1965).

20
John Arkwright, 87, English rugby player.
Claude Auclair, 46, French cartoonist.
Robert Donington, 82, British musicologist.
Hayedeh, 47, Iranian singer, heart attack.
Naruhiko Higashikuni, 102, Japanese royal and politician, prime minister (1945), heart failure.
Hugh Ross, 91, American choral director.
Barbara Stanwyck, 82, American actress (Double Indemnity, Ball of Fire, The Big Valley), Emmy winner (1961, 1966, 1983), heart failure.
Fernand Vandernotte, 87, French Olympic rower (1932, 1936).

21
Asbjørn Bryhn, 83, Norwegian police officer and resistance member during World War II.
Frank Gervasi, 81, American writer and foreign correspondent, stroke.
Trude Fleischmann, 94, Austrian-born American photographer.
Patrick Mulligan, 77, Irish Roman Catholic prelate.
Mark Sugden, 87, Irish rugby player.

22
Gordon Buehrig, 85, American automobile designer.
Giorgio Caproni, 78, Italian writer.
James Dyson, 75, British physicist.
Bill Ferrar, 96, English mathematician.
Karl Frankenstein, 84, German-Israeli educator.
Helmut Krausnick, 84, German historian and writer.
Mariano Rumor, 74, Italian politician, prime minister (1968–1970, 1973–1974), heart attack.
José Salomón, 73, Argentine football player.
Roman Vishniac, 92, Russian-German-American photographer, colon cancer.

23
Buzz Boll, 78, Canadian ice hockey player.
Clarence Bruce, 65, American baseball player.
Allen Collins, 37, American musician (Lynyrd Skynyrd), pneumonia.
Wilhelm Dommes, 82, German U-boat commander during World War II.
Gerald Gibbs, 82, English cinematographer.
Nikolaus Hofreiter, 85, Austrian mathematician.
Charley Eugene Johns, 84, American politician, governor of Florida (1953–1955).
Derek Royle, 61, British actor, cancer.

24
Madge Bellamy, 90, American actress, heart failure.
John Blacking, 61, British anthropologist.
Helga Gnauer, 60, Austrian Olympic fencer (1960).
Princess Teresa Cristina of Saxe-Coburg and Gotha-Koháry, 87, German royal.
Gerry Johnson, 71, American actress and television host.
Muhammad Juman, 54, Pakistani musician.
Saadia Kobashi, 86, Yemenite Jewish community leader in Israel.
Araken Patusca, 84, Brazilian football player.
Shantilal C. Sheth, 77, Indian pediatrician and academic.

25
Dámaso Alonso, 91, Spanish poet and literary critic.
Ava Gardner, 67, American actress (Mogambo, The Night of the Iguana, The Killers), pneumonia.
Edward C. Gleed, 73, American Air Force officer (Tuskegee Airmen).
Miloš Hrazdíra, 44, Czechoslovak racing cyclist and Olympian.
Joseph Lennon, 56, Irish politician.
Alexander Lockwood, 87, American actor.
Georges Mantha, 82, Canadian ice hockey player.
John L. McCrea, 98, American naval officer during World War I and World War II, pneumonia.
Andy Puplis, 74, American football player.
John Ramsey, 62, American sports announcer, heart attack.

26
Dodo Abashidze, 65, Soviet actor and film director.
Hal Draper, 75, American socialist activist, pneumonia.
Lewis Garnsworthy, 67-68, Canadian Anglican prelate.
Bob Gerard, 76, English racing driver.
Toninho Guerreiro, 47, Brazilian football player, stroke.
Miloslav Ištvan, 61, Czechoslovak composer.
Ned Miller, 90, American songwriter, composer, and actor.
Lewis Mumford, 94, American historian.
Philip Nichols, 82, American judge, heart attack.
Boy Trip, 68, Dutch politician.

27
Miklós Borsos, 83, Hungarian sculptor.
Pit Corder, 71, British linguist.
Helen Jerome Eddy, 92, American actress, heart failure.
S. Charles Lee, 90, American architect.
Steffen Thomas, 84, German-American artist and poet.
Travis Webb, 79, American racing driver.
Henry Winterfeld, 88, German-American writer.

28
Joseph Payne Brennan, 71, American author and poet.
Tibor Flórián, 70, Hungarian chess player.
Nancy Gruver, 58, American bridge player.
Puma Jones, 36, American singer, breast cancer.
Jan Lambrichs, 74, Dutch racing cyclist.
Alfred McCoy, 90, American gridiron football player.
Chesley G. Peterson, 69, American Air Force officer and flying ace during World War II.
Edward Szymkowiak, 57, Polish football player.
Casey Tibbs, 60, American cowboy and rodeo performer, bone cancer.
F. W. Winterbotham, 92, British RAF officer and spy during World War II.

29
Stan Batinski, 72, American football player.
Elise Blumann, 93, German-Australian artist.
Irma Brandeis, 84, American scholar of Dante Alighieri.
Arnaud d'Usseau, 73, American screenwriter, stomach cancer.
Hadwen Carlton Fuller, 94, American politician, member of the U.S. House of Representatives (1943–1949).

30
M. A. B. Beg, 55, Pakistani-American theoretical physicist.
Severino Canavesi, 79, Italian racing cyclist.
John Lindgren, 90, Swedish skier and Olympian.
João Uva de Matos Proença, 51, Portuguese diplomat.

31
Muammer Aksoy, 73, Turkish academic.
Ricardo Bordallo, 62, American politician and businessman, suicide.
Rashad Khalifa, 54, Egyptian-American biochemist, stabbed.
Yitzhak Klinghoffer, 84, Austrian-Israeli politician.
Eveline Du Bois-Reymond Marcus, 88, German-Brazilian zoologist.
Ramon Olalkiaga, 91, Spanish footballer.
Samuel C. Phillips, 68, American Air Force general, cancer.
Hans Putz, 69, Austrian actor.
Hazel Marguerite Schmoll, 99, American botanist.
Dick Wilson, 55, American Oglala tribal chairman, kidney failure.

References 

1990-01
 01